Elizabeth Pinfold (née Marks, 1859–1927) was a New Zealand recipient of the Belgian Queen Elisabeth Medal for her work supporting Belgian soldiers in World War I.

Pinfold was born in 1895 the daughter of Captain Marks of Tauranga. In World War I she was active in the Belgian Relief Fund. Learning that Belgian soldiers needed clothing she wrote to newspapers around New Zealand to gather donations of clothing for needy Belgian refugees and soldiers. 

In recognition of her contribution to the war effort she was one of 33 New Zealand women awarded the Queen Elisabeth Medal (Médaille de la Reine Elisabeth) by the Belgian government.

Pinfold died in an accident in Karori, Wellington in 1927. She was buried in the Karori Cemetery. In 2017 a commemorative plaque was unveiled on her grave.

References

External links 
 'Supporting the War Effort' on New Zealand History website – background to New Zealanders receiving the Queen Elisabeth Medal

1859 births
1927 deaths
New Zealand women
Burials at Karori Cemetery